Enoggera is a genus of wasp in the Pteromalidae family. It is native to Australia and has five known species. It was introduced to South Africa to serve as biological pest-control against the Eucalyptus destroying beetle, Trachymela tincticollis.

Taxonomy
Enoggera contains the following species:
 Enoggera nassaui
 Enoggera reticulata

References

Pteromalidae
Hymenoptera genera
Hymenoptera of Australia